The South Florida Bulls football statistical leaders are individual statistical leaders of the South Florida Bulls football program in various categories, including passing, rushing, receiving, total offense, all-purpose yardage, defensive stats, and kicking. Within those areas, the lists identify single-game, single-season, and career leaders. The Bulls represent the University of South Florida in the NCAA's American Athletic Conference.

South Florida began competing in intercollegiate football in 1997, so the typical issues with school records do not exist. There is no period of the late 19th and early 20th century with spotty, incomplete records. Also, the Bulls' records are also not affected by the 1972 NCAA decision to allow freshmen to play varsity football or the 2002 NCAA decision to count bowl games in players' official statistics. One minor issue is that the Bulls played their first four seasons in Division I-AA, now known as Division I FCS, which limits teams to 11 regular-season games (in most years) instead of the 12 that have been allowed in Division I FBS throughout USF's football history.

The lists below are updated through the end of the 2022 season.

Passing

Passing yards

Passing touchdowns

Rushing

Rushing yards

Rushing touchdowns

Receiving

Receptions

Receiving yards

Receiving touchdowns

Total offense
Total offense is the sum of passing and rushing statistics.

Total offense yards

Total touchdowns

All-purpose 
All-purpose yardage is the sum of receiving, rushing, and return statistics.

Total all-purpose yards

Total touchdowns

Defense

Interceptions

Tackles

Sacks

Kicking

Field goals made

Field goal percentage

References

Lists of college football statistical leaders by team
Statistical Leaders